North Star Township is the name of some places in the U.S. state of Minnesota:
North Star Township, Brown County, Minnesota
North Star Township, St. Louis County, Minnesota

Minnesota township disambiguation pages